

History 
So named in 1910 by U.S. Bureau of Fisheries (USBF) because the lake is a great spawning ground of the red or blueback salmon (Nerka). The Eskimo name of the lake, "Agulukpak," meaning "big aguluk," was obtained in 1898 as "Agouloukpak" from A. Mittendorf, a local trader, by J. E. Spurr and W. S. Post, U.S. Geological Survey (USGS). This is probably the same lake called "Pamiek" by Captain M. D. Tebenkov (1852, map 4), Imperial Russian Navy (IRN).
Nerka Lake is a lake in Dillingham Census Area, Alaska.  In August 2010, a bush plane left from a fishing lodge on the lake and crashed nearby.  The crash killed former Senator Ted Stevens and injured former NASA Administrator Sean O'Keefe and his son.

Climate

References

Bodies of water of Dillingham Census Area, Alaska
Lakes of Alaska